Al-Sudah, also As Sudah, is a town in 'Amran Governorate, Yemen. It is the seat of As Sudah District. It is a sizeable administrative center, located in the highlands west of Khamir.

History 
Al-Sudah is first mentioned in 1330 (730 AH), in the Ghayat al-amani of Yahya ibn al-Husayn. From then on it is mentioned frequently as a town and military stronghold, along with its fortress called Qarn al-Naʽi.

References 

Populated places in 'Amran Governorate